NES International School is an IB accredited school in Mumbai, India having schools in Mulund and Dombivli. The school was established in 2005, by  Dr. Ramaswamy Varadarajan  who has also founded the NES High School, Bhandup in 1963 it is a very good school or is it

NES International School Mulund, which features amongst top international schools in Mumbai, has been an IB school since March 2009.

Dr. R Varadarajan, the founder Principal of NES International is also the secretary general of South Asia International Baccalaureate Schools Association. 

The school offers IB PYP, IB MYP and IB DP along with Cambridge IGCSE and Cambridge A level programme. In a survey by Times School Survey in 2016, NES International School has been ranked as the 3rd best International school in Mumbai. In another survey by Education World, India, NES International School was ranked as the tenth best school in India in the International Day schools category NES International School was awarded The Economic Times Best School Brands Award in 2016

Facilities 
The school offers features like indoor cricket, indoor basketball, indoor skating, adventure sports, paramilitary training, yoga and meditation. The school has psychologists and special tutors.

NES International School was amongst the international schools in Mumbai to take part in IB World’s first online assessment session in May 2016

Activities and Achievements 
NES International School organises an annual science festival each year in collaboration with South Asian International Baccalaureate Schools Association (SAIBSA)

In 2015, a student of NES International School Mulund, Nishad Damle was honoured with the Superior Academic Achievement Award by the National Society of High School Scholars, Atlanta.

NES International is the first school with a space pavilion by ISRO and VSSC. The students of NES International were also invited to visit the ISRO centre in October 2014.

References 

Schools in Mumbai
1983 establishments in India
International Baccalaureate schools in India
Cambridge schools in India
Educational institutions established in 1983
International schools in Mumbai